Mahaman Smaila  (born 28 February 1986) is an amateur boxer from Cameroon who competed in the 2008 Olympics at light welterweight but lost his first bout to Cuban Roniel Iglesias. In the 2016 Olympics, he lost his first bout to Batuhan Gözgeç of Turkey in the light welterweight class.

External links
Bio

Boxers at the 2008 Summer Olympics
Boxers at the 2016 Summer Olympics
1986 births
Living people
Olympic boxers of Cameroon
Light-welterweight boxers
Cameroonian male boxers
21st-century Cameroonian people